Khalilah Sabra ( is an American advocate and author best known for her work with refugees in the Middle East and literary contributions to the Joe L. Kincheloe and Shirley R. Steinberg series Transgression: Cultural Studies and Education.

Born in U.S territory in Micronesia, in the Western Pacific, to a military family, Sabra began her working life as a high school student as a political intern after her participation was urged by one of her closest childhood friends, Lynn Dymally, the daughter of State Senator Mervyn Dymally, who became her mentor, as he ascended to the Office of the Lieutenant Governor and United States Congressman. Sabra grew up in Westwood, a district in western Los Angeles, California. She attended Saint Bernadette Catholic School, a private Roman Catholic elementary school in New Haven, Connecticut, and later attended Hamilton High School, a public high school in Los Angeles. Sabra studied criminal justice at California State University earning a graduate degree. Her postgraduate work in Paralegal Studies was completed at UCLA.

Following a fellowship at The Gustavus Myers Center for the Study of Bigotry and Human Rights, Sabra commitment embraced an ethical framework and proposes that an entity, be it an association or individual, has an obligation to act for the benefit of society at large social developed programs coherent path: from stance on social issues, to active collaboration with organizations committed to solidarity. Importance has always been given to the commitment of individuals around the world as the primary mechanism for motivating society as a whole commitment which extend our understanding of the root causes of bigotry and the range of options, we as humans have in constructing alternative ways to share power. Her political perspectives including social democracy and progressivism that allow for inclusion for the underrepresented.

Khalilah Sabra has many past experiences working with various social justice and humanitarian organizations, such as the United Nations Convention on the Elimination of All Forms of Discrimination Against Woman (CEDAW), Amnesty International, and the Bay Area Immigrant Justice Center in San Francisco, California. She is currently on the board of North Carolina Peace Action (NCPA), a consolidation of advocates. Sabra has previously served as a board member on the ACLU Racial Profiling Committee. In her role on the ACLU Racial Program, Sabra contributed to civil rights investigation on issues related to Islam and Muslims.

She began the Muslim American Society (MAS) Immigration Justice Center, which is among the most respected immigration non-profit organizations in the United States. Its services support Latin American communities and African as well. As a board member of the ACLU-Racial Justice Project, Khalilah Sabra, organized prayer vigils in Johnston County to call for an end to racism and bigotry.

In May 2011, Khalilah Sabra on behalf of the Muslim American Society joined with the Latin American Coalition and the Vietnamese Association of Charlotte. complaint under Title VI of the Civil Rights Act of 1964, 42 U.S.C. § 2000d, against the State of North Carolina. Complainants were organizations whose members and constituents include language minority individuals entitled to equitable access to and meaningful participation in North Carolina judicial programs, activities, services, and benefits. They brought this complaint under Title VI of the Civil Rights Act of 1964, 42 U.S.C. § 2000d, against the State of North Carolina and its Judicial Branch, to address Respondents' failure to take reasonable steps to ensure Limited English Proficient ("LEP") persons in North Carolina have meaningful access to the state judicial system.

Sabra was a contributor to the Report of the Attorney General's National Task Force on Children Exposed to Violence. Sabra is the author of "An Unordinary Death: The Life of a Palestinian", a work on critical pedagogy, a teaching approach designed to help students achieve critical consciousness by asking them to question and challenge the beliefs and practices that dominate their society. Sabra designs and implements programs to educate non-Muslims about a moderate version of Islam that denounces violence and extremism. Her career has been focused on representing Muslim women with immigration whose cases involves  forced marriage, honor killing and other threats of violence.

Ideologically, her worldview  combined leftist progressive politics with Islamic spiritual principles and support for Roman Catholic social teachings on immigrant justice. “All persons have the right to find in their own countries the economic, political, and social opportunities to live in dignity and achieve a full life through the use of their God-given gifts. In this context, work that provides a just, living wage is a basic human need."

Since 9/11, Sabra has given controversial speeches about the subsequent marginalization of Muslims, especially Muslim women and religious racism."Gender issues and, in particular, the rights of women in Muslim culture, continue to generate much media attention in the West. Muslim women are often portrayed as inferior beings, despite rights accorded them in Islam which sought their liberation from patriarchal cultures that prevents their progress... As we become more active our work will not be overlooked by scholars and policymakers, as the Muslim woman becomes a significant contributor to policy, culture, and social change. This work is not a recommendation, but a requirement."

"The process of social, political, and cultural change in the United States is incomplete without the voices of Muslim women, particularly those whose words have been actively involved in civic activism and in resistance against inequality. In the west, the common picture of a Muslim woman has yet to transcend the stereotype of a woman hidden behind a veil, a voiceless, silent figure, bereft of rights. It is a picture familiar to all of us, in large part because this is invariably perpetrated by the western media.”Of the necessity for transformational, gender-related advocacy with American Muslim communities, Sabra stated that "only the direct words of Muslim women activists can reveal the depths of their understanding of possibilities and promise in the presence of political and social despair."

In a statement to the Washington Post, Sabra cited one of the major problems for women being forced into situations against their will, “There are no resources out there,” she said. “A Muslim girl can’t go to the community mosque for help. Who supports the community mosque? The men.” She insists that it is “Not a family issue. It is a human rights issue. It is about choice and personal freedom.”

Khalilah Sabra received the International Human Rights Award in 2013. Sabra was honored for her work with refugees in Lebanon, Syria, and nations hosting Palestinian and Syrian civilians as well as for her leadership role as Director of the Muslim American Society Immigrant Justice Center.

Currently, Khalilah Sabra is accredited by the Department of Justice and Board of Immigration Appeals to serves as counsel for aliens in immigration proceedings for Immigration Review, the Board of Immigration Appeals, and Department of Homeland Security.

In an op-ed for Seattle Times, Sabra wrote, Muslim must not be represented by attacks in America. She states: "Civic energy is useless when progressive thought is buried beneath violent transgressions and isolation. We, as a community, must draw a line in the sand. Our community leaders must be more aggressive in reminding its members what values Islam teaches us to embrace, with what degree of passion and what real Islamic character is. Most of all, we must ensure every member knows how to respond to the urges and tensions of a Muslim life that is currently dealing with society’s response to Islam".

The Attorney General's office made revisions to the policy regarding headgear. On Friday, 16 February 2007, MAS was notified by Special Deputy Attorney Neil Dalton that effective 21 February 2007, all customers, with no exception, must have their photos taken without any type of headgear visible except where removal of headgear would violate the religious conviction or wear headgear is worn for medical purposes.

References

 
 
 http://www.chapelhillfriends.org/nl/newsletter-2009-09.pdf

External links

1967 births
Living people
Converts to Islam
American Muslims
California State University alumni